Denisovka is a rural locality (a settlement) in Mosolovskoye Rural Settlement, Anninsky District, Voronezh Oblast, Russia. The population was 1 as of 2010.

Geography 
Denisovka is located 16 km north of Anna (the district's administrative centre) by road. Mikhaylovka 1-ya is the nearest rural locality.

References 

Rural localities in Anninsky District